Bruce Carlyle Gilberd  (born 22 April 1938) is a retired New Zealand Anglican bishop. He was the 8th Bishop of Auckland, from 1985 to 1995.

Gilberd was educated at King's College, Auckland and the University of Auckland. His qualifications are BSc (Auckland), LTh, LTh (Hons), STh (St John).

Gilberd began his ordained ministry as a curate at Devonport, New Zealand. As vicar of Avondale, Auckland from 1968 to 1971, he gained further experience through secondment to Egglescliffe on Teesside in the United Kingdom as an industrial chaplain. On his return, he became director of the Interchurch Trade and Industrial Mission (ITIM) in Wellington.  From 1980 to 1985 he was a lecturer at St John's College, Auckland before being ordained as a bishop on 7 December 1985. A keen fisherman and sailor, he retired in 1995.

Since retiring Gilberd has campaigned against the construction of a new marina at Tairua Harbour on Coromandel Peninsula. In the 2002 New Year Honours, Gilberd was appointed a Companion of the New Zealand Order of Merit, for services to the community.

References

1938 births
Companions of the New Zealand Order of Merit
Anglican bishops of Auckland
Living people
People from Auckland
University of Auckland alumni